Canadian cartoonists have been active since the earliest days of cartooning, in both English and French, the two official languages of Canada.

Canadian cartoonists are prominently active in every area of comics and cartooning, from editorial and gag cartoons, to comic strips, comic books, graphic novels and webcomics.

Brief overview
While earlier examples of Canadian comics tend to imitate American and British examples, over the course of the 20th Century, Canadian cartoonists have cut out niches of their own, as in Hal Foster's pioneering adventure comic strip work on Tarzan and Prince Valiant; in Lynn Johnston's For Better or For Worse, readers follow the characters as they grow older and deal with a variety of issues, unusual for the gag-a-day comic strip world of the latter 20th Century;  Dave Sim's Cerebus tackled epic-sized themes over the course of a 6000-page, self-contained story, while providing new publishing models in the forms of self-publishing and graphic novel collections.

John Wilson Bengough and his Puck-inspired humour magazine Grip (1873–1892) was a popular forum for political cartoons in the earliest decades following Canadian Confederation in 1867.  At the start of the 20th century, Albéric Bourgeois brought what may have been the first continuing comic strip to use word balloons to Canadian newspapers when he created Les Aventures de Timothée in 1903.

In 1938, Toronto-born artist Joe Shuster, along with American writer Jerry Siegel, released Superman to the world, kickstarting the fledgling comic book industry while popularizing the superhero genre. During World War II, Canadian superhero comic books got their start when Adrian Dingle debuted Nelvana of the Northern Lights in Triumph Adventure Comics, one of the "Canadian whites", comic books with colour covers and black-and-white interiors that were common in Canada during the war years.

Canadians made a bigger impact on alternative comics later in the century. Dave Sim's 6000-page epic Cerebus pushed creative boundaries while Sim pushing a model of self-publishing as an ideal. Chester Brown had a broad influence breaking taboos in his Yummy Fur series, and was part of an autobiographical comics trend in the 1990s that included Seth and Julie Doucet. Graphic novels have since become more prominent, and webcomics have also become a popular outlet for Canadian cartoonists.

What is "Canadian"?

The Joe Shuster Awards considers eligible anyone who has Canadian citizenship (regardless of residence) or permanent residence.  The following list reflects that inclusive philosophy in choosing whom to consider "Canadian".

JS HoF = year of induction into the Joe Shuster Hall of Fame

CC HoF = year of induction into the Canadian Cartoonist Hall of Fame

{|class="wikitable sortable" align="center" style="border: 1px solid #88a; background: #f7f8ff; padding: 5px; font-size: 95%; text-align: center;"
! 
! 
! 
! 
! 
! 
! 
! 
! 
! 
! 
|-
!align="center" |Name!!colspan=2|Born!!colspan=2|Died!!Notable works!!Primarylanguage!!Nationality!!JS HoF!!CC HoF!!Honours
|-

|-

|-

|-

|-

|-

|-
|Leo Bachle
|1923
|Toronto, Ontario
|2003
|Toronto, Ontario
|Johnny Canuck
|English
|Canadian
| style="background: #CCCCFF; color: black; vertical-align: middle; text-align: center; " class="table-yes" |2005
|
|
|-
|Bado
| |1949-05-21
|Montréal, Québec
|
|
|Editorial cartoons
|French
English
|Canadian
|
|
|
|-

|-
|Raoul Barré
|1874-01-29
|Montréal, Québec
|1932-05-21
|Montréal, Québec
|
|French
|Canadian
American
|
|
|
|-

|-
|Jimmy Beaulieu
|1974
|
|
|
|
|French
|Canadian
|
|
|
|-

|-

|-

|-

|-

|-

|-

|-
|Albéric Bourgeois
|1876-11-29
|Montréal, Québec
|1962-11-17
|
|Les Aventures de Timothée
|French
|Canadian
|
| style="background: #FFCCCC; color: black; vertical-align: middle; text-align: center; " class="table-yes" |2005
|
|-

|-

|-

|-

|-

|-

|-

|-
|Serge Chapleau
|1945-12-05
|Montréal, Québec
|
|
|Editorial cartoons
|French
|Canadian
|
|
|
|-
|Albert Chartier
|1912
|
|2004
|
|Onésime, Séraphin, Les Canadiens
|French
|Canadian
| style="background: #CCCCFF; color: black; vertical-align: middle; text-align: center; " class="table-yes" |2007
|
|
|-

|-

|-

|-

|-

|-

|-

|-

|-

|-

|-

|-
|Adrian Dingle
|1911
|Barmouth, Gwynedd, Wales
|1974-12-22
|Toronto, Ontario
|Nelvana of the Northern Lights
|English
|Canadian
| style="background: #CCCCFF; color: black; vertical-align: middle; text-align: center; " class="table-yes" |2005
|
|
|-

|-
|Julie Doucet
|1965-12-31
|Montréal, Québec
|
|
|Dirty Plotte
|French
English
|Canadian
|
|
|
|-

|-

|-

|-

|-

|-
|David Finch
|1971-07-04
|
|
|
|
|English
|Canadian
|
|
|
|-

|-
|Pierre Fournier
|1949
|
|
|
|Red Ketchup, Les Aventures du Capitaine Kébec, Croc, Michel Risque
|French
|Canadian
| style="background: #CCCCFF; color: black; vertical-align: middle; text-align: center; " class="table-yes" |2008
|
|
|-

|-

|-
|George Freeman
|1951-05-27
|Selkirk, Manitoba
|
|
|
|English
|Canadian
| style="background: #CCCCFF; color: black; vertical-align: middle; text-align: center; " class="table-yes" |2010
|
|
|-
|Jimmy Frise
|1891
|Scugog Island, Ontario
|1948
|
|Birdseye Center
|English
|Canadian
|
| style="background: #FFCCCC; color: black; vertical-align: middle; text-align: center; " class="table-yes" |2009
|
|-

|-

|-

|-

|-
|Tony Gray
|
|
|
|
|The Incredible Conduit
|English
|Canadian
|
|
|
|-

|-
|Annie Groovie
|1970-04-11
|Trois-Rivières, Québec
|
|
|Léon
|French
|Canadian
|
|
|
|-
|Tom Grummett
|1959
|Saskatoon, Saskatchewan
|
|
|"The Death of Superman"
|English
|Canadian
|
|
|
|-
|Pia Guerra
|
|
|
|
|
|English
|Canadian
|
|
|
|-

|-

|-

|-
|Rand Holmes
|1942-02-22
|Truro, Nova Scotia
|2002-03-15
|Nanaimo, British Columbia
|Harold Hedd
|English
|Canadian
| style="background: #CCCCFF; color: black; vertical-align: middle; text-align: center; " class="table-yes" |2005
| style="background: #FFCCCC; color: black; vertical-align: middle; text-align: center; " class="table-yes" |2007
|
|-
|Jacques Hurtubise (cartoonist)
, aka ZYX
|1950
|
|2015
|
|Croc
|French
|Canadian
| style="background: #CCCCFF; color: black; vertical-align: middle; text-align: center; " class="table-yes" |2007
|
|
|-
|Stuart Immonen
|
|
|
|
|
|English
|Canadian
|
|
|
|-
|Geof Isherwood
|1960-12-04
|Quantico, Virginia
|
|
|
|English
|American
|
|
|
|-

|-
|Henri Julien
|1852-05-14
|Québec City, Québec
|1908-09-17
|
|
|French
|Canadian
|
|
|
|-
|Dale Keown
|1962
|
|
|
|Pitt
|English
|Canadian
|
|
|
|-
|Karl Kerschl
|
|Toronto, Ontario
|
|
|
|English
|Canadian
|
|
|
|-
|Eric Kim
|1977
|
|
|
|
|English
|
|
|
|
|-
|Leonard Kirk
|2000
|United States
|
|
|
|English
|American
|
|
|
|-
|Adrian Kleinbergen
|1961
|Edmonton, Alberta
|
|
|
|English
|Canadian
|
|
|
|-

|-

|-

|-
|Gerald Lazare
|1927
|Toronto, Ontario, Canada
|
|
|Nitro, The Wing, The Dreamer, Drummy Young, Air Woman
|English
|Canadian
| style="background: #CCCCFF; color: black; vertical-align: middle; text-align: center; " class="table-yes" |2007
|
|
|-

|-

|-

|-

|-
|Francis Manapul
|1979-08-26
|
|
|
|
|English
|
|
|
|
|-
|Jason Marcy
|
|
|
|
|Jay's Days
|English
|
|
|
|
|-

|-
|Michael McAdam
|1969-04-30
|Fredericton, New Brunswick
|
|
|Thunder, Spectrum, Twilight Detective Agency, Gloaming, Diaperman
|English
|Canadian
|
|
|
|-
|Bruce McCall
|1935
|Simcoe, Ontario
|
|
|New Yorker cartoons
|English
|
|
|
|
|-
|Ted McCall
|1901
|
|1975
|
|Men of the Mounted, founder of Anglo-American Publishing, Freelance
|English
|Canadian
| style="background: #CCCCFF; color: black; vertical-align: middle; text-align: center; " class="table-yes" |2008
|
|
|-
|Owen McCarron
|1929
|Halifax, Nova Scotia
|2005-06-27
|
|Ghost Rider, Spidey Super Stories, Marvel Fun and Games
|English
|Canadian
| style="background: #CCCCFF; color: black; vertical-align: middle; text-align: center; " class="table-yes" |2006
|
|
|-
|Todd McFarlane
|1961-03-16
|Calgary, Alberta
|
|
|Spawn
|English
|Canadian, American
| style="background: #CCCCFF; color: black; vertical-align: middle; text-align: center; " class="table-yes" |2011
|
|
|-
|Bernie Mireault
|1961
|Marville, France
|
|
| The Jam', Mackenzie Queen, Dr. Robot, Bug-eyed Monster|English
|Canadian
|
|
|
|-

|-
|Win Mortimer
|1919-05-01
|Hamilton, Ontario
|1998-01-11
|
|Superman, Superboy, Batman, Legion of Super-Heroes, Plastic Man, Supergirl, Scooter, Stanley And His Monster, Spider-Man, Boris Karloff's Tales of Mystery, The Twilight Zone, Supernatural Thrillers.
|English
|Canadian
| style="background: #CCCCFF; color: black; vertical-align: middle; text-align: center; " class="table-yes" |2006
|
|
|-

|-
|Mark Oakley
|
|
|
|
|Thieves and Kings|English
|Canadian
|
|
|
|-

|-
|Yanick Paquette
|1974
|
|
|
|
|English
|Canadian
|
|
|
|-
|Louis Paradis
|1959-06-06
|Montmagny, Quebec
|
|
|
|French
|Canadian
|
|
|

|-
|Guillaume Perreault
|1985
|Rimouski, Quebec
|
|
|Pet et Répète: La véritable histoire|French
|Canadian
|
|
|
|-

|-
|Dušan Petričić
|1946-05-10
|
|
|
|Editorial cartoons
|English
|
|
|
|
|-
|Michel Rabagliati
|1961
|Montréal, Québec
|
|
|Paul series
|French
|Canadian
|
|
|
|-

|-
|Steve Requin
|1968-07-21
|Montréal, Québec
|
|
|MensuHell|French
|Canadian
|
|
|
|-
|Yves Rodier
|1967-06-05
|Farnham, Québec
|
|
|
|French
|Canadian
|
|
|
|-

|-
|Arn Saba
|1947
|Vancouver, British Columbia
|
|
|Neil the Horse|English
|Canadian
|
|
|
|-
|Seth
|1962-09-16
|Clinton, Ontario
|
|
|Palookaville, It's a Good Life, If You Don't Weaken|English
|Canadian
|
|
|
|-

|-
|Leanne Shapton
|1973-06-25
|
|
|
|
|English
|
|
|
|
|-

|-
|Dave Sim
|1956-05-17
|Hamilton, Ontario
|
|
|Cerebus|English
|Canadian
| style="background: #CCCCFF; color: black; vertical-align: middle; text-align: center; " class="table-yes" |2006
|
|
|-

|-
|Steve Skroce
|
|Canada
|
|
|
|English
|Canadian
|
|
|
|-
|Kean Soo
|
|England
|
|
|Jellaby|English
|
|
|
|
|-
|Jon St. Ables
|1912-12-23
|Ulverston, England
|1999
|Seattle, Washington
|Piltdown Pete, Brok Windsor, Bill Speed
|English
|Canadian
| style="background: #CCCCFF; color: black; vertical-align: middle; text-align: center; " class="table-yes" |2006
|
|
|-
|Ken Steacy
|1955-01-08
|
|
|
|The Sacred and the Profane, Night and the Enemy, Astro Boy, Johnny Quest, Tempus Fugitive
|English
|Canadian
| style="background: #CCCCFF; color: black; vertical-align: middle; text-align: center; " class="table-yes" |2009
|
|
|-
|Jay Stephens
|1971-03-22
|Toronto, Ontario
|
|
|Chick & Dee, Oh, Brother!|English
|Canadian
|
|
|
|-

|-
|Cameron Stewart
|1967
|Toronto, Ontario
|
|
|
|English
|Canadian
|
|
|
|-

|-

|-
|Jillian Tamaki
|1980-04-17
|Ottawa, Ontario
|
|
|Skim|English
|
|
|
|
|-
|Ty Templeton
|1962-05-09
|
|
|
|Stig's Inferno, Batman Adventures, Justice League
|English
|Canadian
|
|
|
|-

|-
|Marcus To
|1983-10-20
|
|
|
|
|English
|Canadian
|
|
|
|-

|-
|Colin Upton
|1960-04-02
|Winnipeg, Manitoba
|
|
|
|English
|Canadian
|
|
|
|-
|Henriette Valium
|1959-05-04
|Montreal, Canada 
|
|
|
|English
|Canadian
|
|
|
|-
|Peter Whalley
|1921-02-21
|Brockville, Canada
|2007-09-18
|Saint-Jérôme, Quebec
|
|English
|Canadian
|
| style="background: #FFCCCC; color: black; vertical-align: middle; text-align: center; " class="table-yes" |2005
|
|-

|-

|-

|-
|}

See also

Canadian comics
The Great Canadian Comic Books
Québec comics

Further reading
Hirsh, Michael; and Loubert, Patrick. The Great Canadian Comic Books. Peter Martin Associates, 1971. 
Bell, John. Invaders from the North: How Canada Conquered the Comic Book Universe. Toronto: Dundurn Press, 2006. 
Bell, John. Guardians of the North: The National Superhero in Canadian Comic-Book Art. National Archives of Canada, 1992. 
Bell, John. Canuck Comics: A Guide to Comic Books Published in Canada. Matrix Books, 1986. 

References

Notes

Works cited
Bell, John. Invaders from the North: How Canada Conquered the Comic Book Universe''. Toronto: Dundurn Press, 2006.

External links
The Association of Canadian Editorial Cartoonists/L'Association des Dessinateurs d'Éditoriaux website
Joe Shuster Awards website
Doug Wright Awards website

Articles with hCards
Canadian comics creators
Canadian comics creators